The men's team sabre competition in fencing at the 2012 Olympic Games in London was held on 3 August at the ExCeL Exhibition Centre.

Competition format
This team event featured eight national teams. Great Britain, as hosts were allowed to enter a team in any event they chose, however they chose not to enter this event. First round losers continued fencing to determine ranking spots for fifth through eighth, while the quarter-final winners met in the semi-finals. The winners of the semi-final bouts competed for the gold medal, while the losing teams competed for the bronze.

Team events competed to a maximum of 45 touches.

Schedule 
All times are British Summer Time (UTC+1)

Draw

Finals

Classification 5–8

Final classification

References

Results 

Men's team sabre
Men's events at the 2012 Summer Olympics